Cao is the pinyin romanization of the Chinese surname  (Cáo). It is listed 26th in the Song-era Hundred Family Surnames poem. Cao is romanized as "Tsao" in Wade-Giles (Ts'ao), which is widely adopted in Taiwan, although the apostrophe is often omitted in practice. It is romanized "Cho", "Tso", and "Chaw" in Cantonese; "Chou", "Chô", and "Chháu" in Hokkien; and "Chau", "Chow" in Teochew.The Vietnamese surname based on it is now written "Tào". It is romanized "Zau" or "Dzau" in Shanghainese.

Distribution
Cao is the 30th-most-common surname in mainland China as of 2019  and the 58th-most-common surname on Taiwan.

In the United States, the romanization Cao is a fairly common surname, ranked 7,425th during the 1990 census but 2,986th during the year 2000 census. It is one of the few Chinese surnames whose pinyin transcription is already more common than other variants. The Wade transcription Tsao was only ranked 16,306th during the 1990 census and 12,580th during the year 2000 one. The Cantonese transcription is actually becoming less common, falling from 7,638th place to 9,925th. The Korean name Cho is more common still than Cao, befitting its frequency in Korea itself, where it makes up about 2% of the South Korean population: see Cho (Korean name).

History
Cáo's former pronunciations have been reconstructed as *N-tsˤu in Old Chinese and Dzaw in Middle Chinese. The later claim that Cao is said to have been descended from the Yellow Emperor via the Zhuanxu Emperor should not be confused with the Chinese surname Gao or the Vietnamese surname Cao. It was the origin of the modern Cāo and Zhu families. Yan (顏) was from Cao (曹).

 Another origin is that it is derived from the ancestral name of a descendant of Zhurong, the founder of the state of Zhu, later named Zou, and located in modern Zouxian, Shandong. After the state was annexed by Chu during the Spring and Autumn period Cao (曹) was adopted as a surname by its former subjects.
 from the name of a state, State of Cao (曹国), (located in Dingtao in Shandong province) granted to Zhenduo, the thirteenth son of the virtuous King Wen of Zhou. After the state was annexed by Song, Cao (曹) was adopted as a surname.
 Taken as a surname by the Sogdians when they came to China and became one of the "Nine Sogdian Surnames", also known as 'nine surnames of Zhaowu'.

Other surnames
Cao can also serve as the romanization for the Chinese surnames Cāo, Cǎo, and Cào as well; however, they are not nearly so common. They were both unlisted among the Hundred Family Surnames and do not appear among any list of the current popular surnames.

Cāo was likely *tsʰˤawʔ in Old Chinese and TshawX in Middle Chinese; its original meaning was "grasp". It originated from the given name of one of Cao Cao's descendants after the establishment of Cao Wei. Its modern use as a curse word depends on a recent homophone and is unrelated to the surname.

Cǎo was likely *tsʰˤuʔ in Old Chinese, but had become a homophonous TshawX by Middle Chinese; its meaning is still "grass" and similar plants.

List of people with the surname

Historical figures
 Cao Teng,  Eunuch of the Han Dynasty, Cao Cao's grandfather
 Cao Song, Official of the Han Dynasty, Cao Cao's father
 Cao Cao (155–220), Warlord and Chancellor of The Han dynasty, laid the foundation of Cao Wei 
 Consort Duan (Cao), concubine of the Jiajing Emperor during the Ming dynasty, executed for conspiracy in a plot to assassinate him
 Cao Fang (232–274), third emperor of the state of Cao Wei in the Three Kingdoms period
 Cao Mao, Fourth emperor of the state of Cao Wei in the Three Kingdoms period
 Cao Huan,  Fifth and last emperor of the state of Cao Wei in the Three Kingdoms period
 Cao Hong (d. 232), Cao Cao's cousin, general of Cao Wei
 Cao Pi (187–226), Cao Cao's son, ended the Han Dynasty and founded the state of Cao Wei in the Three Kingdoms period, ruled as the first emperor of Wei
 Cao Ren (168–223), Cao Cao's cousin, general of Cao Wei
 Cao Rui (205–239), Cao Pi's son, ruled as the second emperor of Cao Wei
 Cao Shen (d. 190), Han Dynasty chancellor
 Cao Shuang (d. 249), Cao Zhen's son, regent of Cao Wei during Cao Fang's reign, later lost power to Sima Yi
 Cao Xiu (d. 228), a distant nephew of Cao Cao, general of Cao Wei
 Cao Zhang (d. 223), Cao Cao's son, served as a general under his father
 Cao Zhen (d. 231), a distant nephew of Cao Cao, general of Cao Wei
 Cao Zhi (192–232), Cao Cao's son, a famous poet
 Empress Cao Jie, Cao Cao's daughter, last Empress of the Han dynasty 
 Cao Guojiu, or royal uncle Cao, Song dynasty royalty immortalized as one of the Eight Immortals in Chinese mythology
 Cao Bin, Military general of the Song dynasty
 Cao Xueqin (1715 or 1724—1763 or 1764), author of the Chinese classic novel Dream of the Red Chamber
 Terence Cao, Singaporean actor
 Cao Lỗ, weaponry engineer and minister

Modern figures
 Cao Kun (1862-1938), a military leader in the Zhili clique during the Warlord Era
 Cao Yu (1910-1996), the pen name of Wan Jiabao, an important playwright in modern China
 Huai-Dong Cao (b. 1959), mathematician and managing editor of the Journal of Differential Geometry
 Cao Gangchuan (b. 1935), former Chinese Minister of Defence
 Chin-hui Tsao (b. 1981), Major League Baseball pitcher for the Los Angeles Dodgers
 Peter Tsao (1933–2005), Hong Kong civil servant
 Tsao Chieh (1953–1996), Singaporean composer and engineer
 Tsao Chun-yang (b. 1976), Taiwanese baseball player for the Uni-President Lions
 Miguel Tsao, Taiwanese Vice Minister of Foreign Affairs
 Cho Tat-wah (1915–2007), Hong Kong actor
 Mandy Cho (b. 1982), Hong Kong entertainer
 Raymond Cho (b. 1936), Hong Kong politician
 Raymond Cho (b. 1964), Hong Kong actor
 Gary Chaw, Malaysian Chinese singer-songwriter based in Taiwan
 Cao Yupeng (Chinese snooker player)
 Cao Lu (b. 1987), Chinese singer, actress & former member of the K Pop girl group Fiestar
 Tsao Chi-hung, Minister of Council of Agriculture of the Republic of China (2016–2017)
 Paul Cao, Computer Science and Engineering Professor at the University of California, San Diego
 Cho Miyeon (b. 1997), Korean actress, dancer & main vocalist of the K-Pop girl group (G)I-DLE. Also plays as the voice & singer behind Ahri of K/DA (LoL)
 Cao Ruyin, (1967 or 1968–2008), Chinese construction worker and deceased victim of a murder case in Singapore. His killer Kho Jabing, a Malaysian, was hanged in 2016.
 Victor Dzau, (b. 1947), President of the United States National Academy of Medicine (formerly the Institute of Medicine) of the United States National Academy of Sciences
 Cao Yang, is a Chinese international football player

See also

Chal (name)
Cao (Vietnamese surname)

References

Chinese-language surnames
Individual Chinese surnames
Eight surnames of Zhurong